Little Bear Peak is a high mountain summit in the Sangre de Cristo Range of the Rocky Mountains of North America.

Mountain

Like the rest of the Sierra Blanca Massif, Little Bear is composed of pre-Cambrian granite estimated to be approximately 1.8 billion years old.  Along with nearby Blanca Peak and Ellingwood Point Little Bear rises nearly 7,000 feet above the San Luis Valley to the west and south. The peak sits atop a long ridge separating two glacier-carved valleys.

While Little Bear itself has little more than the minimum 300 feet of prominence to qualify as a separate peak, it is notable for being one of the most technically difficult and dangerous of the fourteeners to climb. The upper part of the standard route leads through a 300' section known as the Hourglass: a water-polished granite slab famous for the amount of rockfall. There is another technical route that climbs the northwest face of Little Bear from above the Blue Lakes and gains over 6,200 ft in elevation. The easiest climbing routes on the mountain are on the eastern side, rising out of the private property in Blanca Basin.

The connecting ridge to Blanca Peak is one of the most challenging outings of its type in the state. Experts say the traverse is easier going from Little Bear to Blanca but once a climber commits to the traverse, he's committed to the end. There are only a couple places down off the rock that are reasonably safe and they drop into Blanca Basin.

Little Bear is bisected by the boundary between the Rio Grande National Forest to the west and private property to the east, and is on the border between Alamosa County and Costilla County.

Historical names
Little Bear
Little Bear Peak 
West Peak

See also

List of mountain peaks of Colorado
List of Colorado fourteeners

References

External links

 

Mountains of Colorado
Mountains of Alamosa County, Colorado
Mountains of Costilla County, Colorado
Rio Grande National Forest
Sangre de Cristo Mountains
Fourteeners of Colorado
North American 4000 m summits